James Harold Wilson, Baron Wilson of Rievaulx, KG, OBE, FRS, PC (11 March 1916 – 24 May 1995) was one of the most prominent British politicians of the 20th century.

There is an extensive bibliography on Harold Wilson.  He is the author of a number of books.  He is the subject of many biographies (both light and serious) and academic analyses of his career and various aspects of the policies pursued by the governments he has led.  He features in many "humorous" books.  He was the Prime Minister in the so-called "Swinging London" era of the 1960s, and therefore features in many of the books about this period of history.

Principal books by Harold Wilson
 
 
 
 
 
 
 
 
 
 
 
 
 
 
 
 
 

In addition, several speeches and articles by Wilson are listed in the COPAC catalogue.

Selected titles about Harold Wilson

Biography
 Farr, Martin. ""Wilson, (James) Harold, 1st Baron Wilson 1916-1995." in Reader's Guide to British History London: Routledge, 2003. online at Credo Reference. 
 Jenkins, Roy. "Wilson, (James) Harold, Baron Wilson of Rievaulx (1916–1995)," Oxford Dictionary of National Biography, Oxford University Press, 2004; online edn, Jan 2009 accessed 15 Oct 2012
 Moran, Jon. "Conspiracy and contemporary history: revisiting MI5 and the Wilson plot [s]." Journal of Intelligence History 13.2 (2014): 161–175.

Memoirs of his staff

Politics
 Crines, Andrew Scott. "Harold Wilson's rhetoric." Renewal: a Journal of Labour Politics 22.3/4 (2014): 128+ online.
 Favrettoa, Ilaria. "'Wilsonism' reconsidered: Labour party revisionism 1952–64," Contemporary British History (2000) 14#4 pages 54–80 
 Fielding, Steven. "Rethinking Labour's 1964 Campaign," Contemporary British History, (Sept 2007) 21#3 pp 309–324
 Fielding, Steven, ed. The Labour governments, 1964–70, volume 1: Labour and cultural change (Manchester UP, 2003).
 
 Harper, Tobias. "Harold Wilson’s ‘Lavender List’Scandal and the Shifting Moral Economy of Honour." Twentieth Century British History 31.1 (2020): 79-100.
 Heppell, Timothy. "The Labour Party leadership election of 1963: Explaining the unexpected election of Harold Wilson." Contemporary British History 24.2 (2010): 151-171.
 Irving, Henry. "The birth of a politician: Harold Wilson and the bonfires of controls, 1948–9." Twentieth century British history 25.1 (2014): 87-107. online
 King, Anthony. The British General Election of 1966 (1966).
 Lapping, Brian. The Labour Government, 1964–70 (Penguin books, 1970).

Domestic policies
 Blick, Andrew. "Harold Wilson, Labour and the machinery of government." Contemporary British History (2006) 20#3 pp: 343-362.
 

 Cairncross, Alexander Kirkland, and Barry J. Eichengreen. Sterling in Decline: the Devaluations of 1931, 1949, and 1967 (Basil Blackwell, 1983)
 Childs, David. Britain since 1945: a political history. (Taylor & Francis, 2006)
 Crines, Andrew S., and Kevin Hickson, eds. Harold Wilson: The Unprincipled Prime Minister?: A Reappraisal of Harold Wilson (Biteback Publishing, 2016). online review
 Dorey, Peter. "The Fall of the Wilson Government, 1970." in How Labour Governments Fall: From Ramsay Macdonald to Gordon Brown (2013): 83+.
 Dorey, Pete. "‘Well, Harold Insists on Having It!’—The Political Struggle to Establish The Open University, 1965–67." Contemporary British History 29.2 (2015): 241-272. online
 Heppell, Timothy. Choosing the Labour Leader: Labour Party Leadership Elections from Wilson to Brown (2010).
 O'Hara, Glen. "'Dynamic, Exciting, Thrilling Change': the Wilson Government's Economic Policies, 1964–70," Contemporary British History, (Sept 2006) 20#3 pp 383–402
 
 Rogers, Chris. (2011) "Economic Policy and the Problem of Sterling under Harold Wilson and James Callaghan," Contemporary British History (2011) 25#3 pp 339–363.
 Warner, Geoffrey. "Putting pressure on O'Neill: the Wilson government and Northern Ireland 1964–69." Irish Studies Review (2005) 13#1 pp: 13-31.

Foreign and military policies
 Broad, Matthew. Harold Wilson, Denmark and the Making of Labour European Policy, 1958-72 (Oxford UP, 2018).
 Coggins, Richard. "Wilson and Rhodesia: UDI and British policy towards Africa." Contemporary British History  (2006) 20#3 pp: 363-381.
 
 Colman, Jonathan. "Harold Wilson, Lyndon Johnson and Anglo-American 'summit diplomacy', 1964–68." Journal of Transatlantic Studies (2003) 1#2 pp: 131-151.
 
 
 Dockrill, Saki. "Forging the Anglo-American global defence partnership: Harold Wilson, Lyndon Johnson and the Washington summit, December 1964." Journal of Strategic Studies (2000) 23#4 pp: 107-129.
 Dockrill, Saki. "Britain's power and influence: Dealing with three roles and the Wilson government's defence debate at Chequers in November 1964." Diplomacy and Statecraft (2000) 11#1 pp: 211-240.
 Doyle, Suzanne. "A Foregone Conclusion? The United States, Britain and the Trident D5 Agreement." Journal of Strategic Studies 40.6 (2017): 867-894. online
 Gill, David James. Britain and the bomb: nuclear diplomacy, 1964-1970 (Stanford University Press, 2014).
 Gill, David James. (2011) "The Ambiguities of Opposition: Economic Decline, International Cooperation, and Political Rivalry in the Nuclear Policies of the Labour Party, 1963-1964," Contemporary British History (2011) 25# 2 pp 251–276
 Haeussler, Mathias. "A pyrrhic victory: Harold Wilson, Helmut Schmidt, and the British renegotiation of EC membership, 1974–5." International History Review 37.4 (2015): 768-789. online
 Hughes, Geraint. Harold Wilson's Cold War: The Labour Government and East-West Politics, 1964-1970 (Boydell & Brewer Ltd, 2015).
 Llewelyn, James. "Steadfast Yet Reluctant Allies: Japan and the United Kingdom in the Vietnam War," Diplomacy and Statecraft (2011) 22#4 pp 608–633.
 Oliver, Michael J. (2011) "The Management of Sterling, 1964–1967," English Historical Review (June 2011) 126#520 pp 582–613.
 
 Pine, Melissa. Harold Wilson and Europe: Pursuing Britain's Membership of the European Community (IB Tauris, 2007)
 Robb, Thomas. (2011) "The 'Limit of What is Tolerable': British Defence Cuts and the 'Special Relationship,' 1974-1976," Diplomacy and Statecraft (2011) 22#2 pp 321–337.
 Rogers, Chris. "Economic Policy and the Problem of Sterling under Harold Wilson and James Callaghan," Contemporary British History (2011) 25#3 pp 339–363.
 Spelling, Alex. "'A Reputation for Parsimony to Uphold': Harold Wilson, Richard Nixon and the Re-Valued 'Special Relationship’1969–1970." Contemporary British History (2013) 27#2 pp: 192-213.
 Stoddart, Kristan. "The British Labour Government and the development of Chevaline, 1974–79." Cold War History 10.3 (2010): 287-314.
 Stoddart, Kristan. "The Wilson government and British responses to anti-ballistic missiles, 1964–1970." Contemporary British History 23.1 (2009): 1-33.
 Vickers, Rhiannon. "Harold Wilson, the British Labour Party, and the War in Vietnam." Journal of Cold War Studies(2008) 10#2 pp: 41-70.
 Walker, John R. Britain and Disarmament: The UK and Nuclear, Biological and Chemical Weapons Arms Control and Programmes, 1956-1975 (Ashgate, 2012).
 Wall, Stephen. The Official History of Britain and the European Community, Volume III: The Tiger Unleashed, 1975-1985 (Routledge, 2018).
 Wilson, Craig. "Rhetoric, reality and dissent: The Vietnam policy of the British labour government, 1964–1970." Social Science Journal (1986) 23#1 pp: 17-31.

Swinging London

"Humour"
 
 
 
 
 
 
 
 

Bibliography
Bibliographies by writer
Bibliographies of British writers
Books written by prime ministers of the United Kingdom